Evangeline is a 1981 album by Emmylou Harris that was composed mostly of leftover material from past recording sessions and which did not fit into any of her other albums. Songs included a remake of "Mister Sandman" (from the much-lauded Trio sessions with Dolly Parton and Linda Ronstadt), "Evangeline" (also featuring vocals by Parton and Ronstadt), which she had previously performed with The Band, Rodney Crowell's "Ashes By Now", and a cover of John Fogerty's "Bad Moon Rising". Though it received mixed reviews upon its release, the album was yet another commercial success for Harris. It was certified Gold in less than a year after its release. A single release of "Mister Sandman" (Top 10 country/Top 40 pop) did well on the charts, though neither Ronstadt's nor Parton's record companies would allow their artists' vocals to be used on the single, so Harris rerecorded the song, singing all three parts for the single release. Rodney Crowell's "I Don't Have to Crawl" was released as the album's second single. (Music videos were produced for both "Mister Sandman" and "I Don't Have to Crawl".)

The album is one of two Harris albums that have never been issued separately on CD (though in 2011 the album's tracks became available for digital download on iTunes). The album is now available as a CD in a collection issued in 2013 entitled Emmylou Harris Original Album Series Vol. 2.

Track listing

Personnel

Brian Ahern – acoustic guitar, electric guitar, arch-Top guitar, gut string guitar, 6-string bass, tambourine
Hal Blaine – drums
Mike Bowden – bass
David Briggs – piano
Tony Brown – piano
James Burton – electric guitar
Rodney Crowell – acoustic guitar, electric guitar
Hank DeVito – pedal steel
Jerry Douglas – dobro
Steve Fishell – dobro
Amos Garrett – electric guitar
Emory Gordy Jr. – bass, Ernie Ball bass
Glen Hardin – electric piano
Emmylou Harris – vocals, acoustic guitar, backing vocals
Waylon Jennings – duet vocals
Don Johnson – piano, backing vocals
Lynn Langham – synthesizer
Albert Lee – electric guitar, piano
Dave Lewis – drums
Larrie Londin – drums
Dolly Parton – backing vocals
Bill Payne – piano, electric piano
Herb Pedersen – backing vocals
Mickey Raphael – harmonica
Mac Rebbenack – piano
Frank Reckard – acoustic guitar, electric guitar
Tony Rice – acoustic guitar, backing vocals
Linda Ronstadt – backing vocals
Craig Safan – string arrangements
Ricky Skaggs – acoustic guitar, fiddle, mandolin, backing vocals
Barry Tashian – backing vocals
John Ware – drums, percussion
Cheryl White – backing vocals
Sharon White – backing vocals

Technical
Brian Ahern – producer, engineer
Donivan Cowart – engineer
Bradley Hartman – engineer
Stuart Taylor – engineer

Charts

Weekly charts

Year-end charts

References

 Emmylou Harris Evangeline liner notes

Emmylou Harris albums
1981 albums
Albums produced by Brian Ahern (producer)
Warner Records albums